Charles Fillmore Mebus (June 15, 1928—January 12, 1990) was a former Republican member of the Pennsylvania House of Representatives.

Biography
A resident of Wyncote, Pennsylvania in 1965, Charles Mebus was elected to the multi member Third Legislative District of the Pennsylvania State House of Representatives from Montgomery County, Pennsylvania, United States. He served until 1968 when he was elected to the newly established single member 154th Pennsylvania State Assembly District which included all of Cheltenham Township, the borough of Jenkintown, Pennsylvania and a portion of Springfield Township, Montgomery County, Pennsylvania. 

He would servd for six terms before retiring in 1978.

He died in Hershey, Pennsylvania on January 2, 1990.

References

Republican Party members of the Pennsylvania House of Representatives
1990 deaths
1928 births
20th-century American politicians